Yussuf Moli Yesky (born January 1, 1965) is a middle distance and long distance athlete who competed internationally for Chad

Yesky represented Chad at the 1988 Summer Olympics in Seoul, he competed in the 800 metres where he finished eighth in his heat and therefore did not qualify for the next round, four years later he competed in the 5000 metres at the 1992 Summer Olympics held in Barcelona, he finished 14th in heat, therefore did not qualify for the final.

References

1965 births
Living people
Olympic athletes of Chad
Athletes (track and field) at the 1988 Summer Olympics
Athletes (track and field) at the 1992 Summer Olympics
Chadian male middle-distance runners
Chadian male long-distance runners